The  Quinimarí River is a river in northwestern Venezuela.

The Quinimarí River rises in the Tamá Massif.
It drains the southern slope of the Táchira depression.
It is located in the municipality of Córdoba in the state of Táchira, Venezuela. 
It joins the Torbes River and then flows into the Uribante River, a tributary of the Apure River, in the Orinoco basin.
The Quinimarí basin holds extensive areas producing coffee and sugar cane, which are favored by the humid mountain climate of the area. 
The river is named after the "Quenemaríes" indigenous people that inhabited this part of the Venezuelan Andes.

Settlements on the river's banks include villages such as San Vicente de La Revancha, Río Chiquito, La Petrolea, Estación Santa Ana and  Santa Ana del Táchira, capital of the municipality.
La Petrolea on the left bank is where oil exploration began in Venezuela in 1878 after a strong earthquake devastated the area and released the so-called "black gold" in the Quebrada La Alquitrana, a tributary just  from the Quinimarí River. 
Oil still flows from the subsoil in small quantities, a factor that limits the use of the river as a tourist attraction.

See also
List of rivers of Venezuela

References

Sources

Rivers of Venezuela